This is a list of artists who have recorded for Rykodisc Records.
Listed in parentheses are names of affiliated labels for which the artist recorded for Rykodisc in conjunction with.

A
 Andrew Bird's Bowl of Fire
 Auto Interiors

B
 Badfinger
 Bang Gang
 Sally Barker
 Basshunter (Cordless/Rykodisc)
 Chris Bell
 Jay Bennett
 Big Star
 Breakup Breakdown  (Cordless/Rykodisc)
 David Bowie
 Kevin Brown

C
 Belinda Carlisle
 Bootsy Collins
 Elvis Costello and the Attractions
 The Crash
 Robert Cray
 Justin Currie
 Catie Curtis
 John Cale (Hannibal)
 Justin Currie

D
 Dangerous Muse (Cordless/Rykodisc)
 Dave Stewart & Barbara Gaskin (Rykodisc)
 Death Angel
 Del Lords, The (Restless/Rykodisc)
 Devo
 Die Mannequin (Cordless/Rykodisc)
 Director  (Cordless/Rykodisc)
 Matt Duke

E
 Elf Power
 Brian Eno
 Roky Erickson (Restless/Rykodisc)
 Alejandro Escovedo
 Eskimo Joe

F
 Fastball
 Lawrence Ferlinghetti
 Jeff Finlin
 Freezepop

G
 Galaxie 500
 Thea Gilmore
 Gliss (Cordless/Rykodisc)
 Golden Smog
 Robert Gordon & Chris Spedding
 Meral Guneyman

H
 Pete Ham
 Mickey Hart
 Miho Hatori
 Robert Hazard
 Jimi Hendrix
 Kristin Hersh
 Bill Hicks
 HUMANWINE (Cordless/Rykodisc)
 Will Hoge

J
 Jihad Jerry & The Evildoers (Cordless/Rykodisc)
 Joe Jackson
 John Hegley
 John & Mary
 Evan Johns & the H-Bombs
 Jump with Joey
 Junior Senior
 Jupiter One  (Cordless/Rykodisc)

K
 Kennedy (Cordless/Rykodisc)
 Jack Kerouac
 Steve Kilbey
 James Kochalka Superstar
 Koishii & Hush (Cordless/Rykodisc)
 Peter Koppes

L
 Ladytron
 Keith Levene's Violent Opposition
 Nils Lofgren
 Gary Louris
 Lucky Dube

M
 Roger Joseph Manning, Jr. (Cordless/Rykodisc)
 Mahavishnu John McLaughlin
 Matthew
 Maven (Cordless/Rykodisc)
 Leslie Mendelson
 Ministry
 Mission of Burma
 Joey Molland
 Mono
 Mono Puff
 Morphine
 Mothers of Invention
 Bob Mould
 Mouth Music
 Misfits
 My Life with the Thrill Kill Kult
 Megan McCormick
 Keb Mo
 Allison Moorer
 Medeski, Martin & Wood

N

 New Potato Caboose 
 Nine Inch Nails (Speedo Rykodisc)
 Nickel Eye
 The Notorious MSG  (Cordless/Rykodisc)

O
 Yoko Ono
 Oranj Symphonette
 Osaka Popstar
 Mark Olson

P
 Plan B (Cordless/Rykodisc)
 The Posies

R
 The Residents (Cordless/Rykodisc)
 Raspberries
 Resurrecting the Champ
 Revolting Cocks
 Josh Rouse
 Rusty Truck

S
 Sam & Ruby
 Seasick Steve
 Skye (Cordless/Rykodisc)
 The Soft Boys
 Soul Asylum
 Ringo Starr & His All-Starr Band
 The Storys
 Sugar
 Supreme Beings of Leisure
 Skerik's Syncopated Taint Septet (Rykodisc/Ropeadope)

T
 The Takeover UK
 Throw The Fight (Cordless/Rykodisc)
 Throwing Muses
 Tin Hat
 James Jackson Toth

W
 Was (Not Was)
 Kelly Willis
 Wednesday 13
 Willard Grant Conspiracy
 Marty Willson-Piper
 Waltham
 Matt White

X
 XrayOK (Cordless/Rykodisc)

Y
 The Young Knives

Z
 Frank Zappa
 Zillatron (Bootsy Collins)
 Martin Zellar

References

Rykodisc